Procalyptis is a genus of moths belonging to the subfamily Tortricinae of the family Tortricidae.
These are small brown moths with fringed wings.

Species
Procalyptis albanyensis Strand, 1924
Procalyptis oncota Meyrick, 1910
Procalyptis parooptera (Turner, 1925)

See also
List of Tortricidae genera

References

 , 1910, Proc. Linn. Soc. N.S. W. 35: 204.
 , 2005, World Catalogue of Insects 5.

External links
tortricidae.com

Archipini
Tortricidae genera